Army Public School is an English-medium co-ed school located at Ballygunge, Kolkata, India. The school offers education up to 10+2 with 3 major streams in the +2 level. The school was established in 1994 with 7 teachers and 173 students. The school is affiliated to the CBSE.

The school as a whole  is dedicated for the education of children of retired and serving Military personnel, and a very few seats are earmarked for Civilian candidates.

History

References

External links 
 

Indian Army Public Schools
Schools in Kolkata
Educational institutions established in 1994
1994 establishments in West Bengal